UFC 35: Throwdown was a mixed martial arts event held by the Ultimate Fighting Championship at the Mohegan Sun Arena in Uncasville, Connecticut on January 11, 2002. The event was seen live on pay per view in the United States, and later released on home video.

History
UFC 35 featured two title bouts, Jens Pulver faced BJ Penn for the Lightweight Title and Murilo Bustamante faced Dave Menne for the Middleweight Title. This was the first UFC event to be headlined by a Lightweight bout.

According to a December 2008 Sherdog interview with Pat Miletich, the event was plagued by a flu-like illness that spread throughout the fighters, trainers, and production staff.

Despite a number of fighters suffering from such symptoms as diarrhea, dehydration, hallucinations, and vomiting, the event proceeded as planned. Most people attributed the illness to a hotel restaurant named "The Octagon". Kevin Randleman admitted to defecating inside his fight shorts during his bout with Renato "Babalu" Sobral. Dave Menne was drinking Pepto Bismol until his walk to the cage. Eugene Jackson also fought (and won) with a fever.

Shonie Carter was originally scheduled to face Gil Castillo at this event, but was pulled due to outside contractual obligations with another promotion. Chris Brennan stepped in as his replacement.

Shortly after this event, Jens Pulver would leave UFC due to a contract dispute.

Results

See also
 Ultimate Fighting Championship
 List of UFC champions
 List of UFC events
 2002 in UFC

References

External links
 Official UFC website

Ultimate Fighting Championship events
Events in Uncasville, Connecticut
2002 in mixed martial arts
Mixed martial arts in Connecticut
Sports in Uncasville, Connecticut
2002 in sports in Connecticut